Betonica officinalis (syn. Stachys officinalis), commonly known as common hedgenettle, betony, purple betony, wood betony, bishopwort, or bishop's wort, is a species of flowering plant in the mint family Lamiaceae, native to Europe, western Asia, and northern Africa.

Pliny (25, 8, 46, § 84) calls the plant both betonica and vettonica, claiming that the Vettones used it as a herbal medicine. It is commonly known as Stachys officinalis, the word stachys coming from the Greek, meaning "an ear of grain," and refers to the fact that the inflorescence is often a spike.

The Latin specific epithet officinalis refers to plants which had a culinary or medicinal use.

Description
Its leaves are stalked on upright stems, narrowly oval, with a heart-shaped base, with a somewhat wrinkled texture and toothed margins. The calyx is 5–7 mm long, with 5 teeth, edged with bristles. The corolla 1–1.5 cm long. Its upper lip flat, almost straight when seen from the side. The anthers stick straight out. It flowers in mid summer from July to September, and is found in dry grassland, meadows and open woods in most of Europe, western Asia and North Africa. In the British Isles it is common in England and Wales, but rare in Ireland and northern Scotland.

The aerial parts contain phenylethanoid glycosides, (betonyosides A-F) and  acetoside, acetoside isomer, campneosides II, forsythoside B and leucosceptoside B. The roots contain diterpene glycosides, betonicosides A-D and the diterpene, betonicolide.

Culture

Folklore
The first reference to betony occurs in a work by the Roman physician Antonius Musa, who claimed it as being effective against sorcery. It was planted in churchyards to prevent activity by ghosts.

The Anglo Saxon Herbal recommends its use to prevent "frightful nocturnal goblins and terrible sights and dreams". A Welsh charm prescribes: to prevent dreaming, take the leaves of betony, and hang about your neck, or else drink the juice on going to bed.

Proverbs and sayings
An Italian proverb advises that you should "Sell your coat and buy betony", whereas a Spanish compliment states, "He has as many virtues as betony".

Herbal use
The plant was commonly grown in physic gardens of apothecaries and monasteries for medicinal purposes, hence the specific epithet officinalis which indicates use for medicinal or culinary purposes.

Betony was an ingredient of "pistoja powder," an old remedy for arthritis and gout. It was also claimed to be effective against snake and dog bites, and was believed to be a cure for drunkenness. Richard E. Banks stated that you should "Eat betony or the powder thereof and you cannot be drunken that day."

John Gerard (1597) said that "It maketh a man to pisse well" While Nicholas Culpeper stated that, "...it preserves the liver and bodies of men from the danger of epidemical diseases, and from witchcraft also" and "...this is a precious herb, well worth keeping in your house". He also states that betony is astrologically ruled by Jupiter and Aries.

Betony has also been used in traditional Austrian medicine internally as tea, or externally as compresses or baths for treatment of disorders of the respiratory tract, gastrointestinal tract, nervous system, skin and gynecological problems.

Modern herbalists prescribe betony to treat anxiety, gallstones, heartburn, high blood pressure, migraine and neuralgia, and to prevent sweating. It can also be used as an ointment for cuts and sores.

References

Lamiaceae
Flora of Africa
Flora of Asia
Flora of Europe
Taxa named by Carl Linnaeus